Mickey MacDonell (April 30, 1902 – November 1, 1983) was an American football player who played eight seasons in the NFL, mainly for the Chicago Cardinals.

External links
Career stats

1902 births
1983 deaths
American football running backs
Duluth Kelleys players
Chicago Cardinals players
Frankford Yellow Jackets players
Players of American football from Minnesota